The Studebaker US6 (G630) was a series of -ton 6×6 and 5-ton 6×4 trucks manufactured by the Studebaker Corporation and REO Motor Car Company during World War II. The basic cargo version was designed to transport a  cargo load over any type of terrain in any weather. Most of these were exported to the Soviet Union under Lend-Lease by the USA during World War II, since the competing GMC 6×6 CCKW design proved to be more suitable for Western Front conditions.

History

Design and development
In 1939–1940 the US Army Ordnance Corps was developing  tactical 6×6 trucks that could operate off-road in all weather. Studebaker, Yellow Coach (a GM company) and International Harvester all submitted designs that were accepted and went into production in 1941.

A total of 219,882 -ton 6×6 trucks and similar  6×4 versions in thirteen variations were built. Studebaker was the primary manufacturer, which built 197,678 of them at its South Bend IN plant, while Reo produced 22,204 more at its Lansing, Michigan plant from 1944 under a sub-contract. Reo trucks are identical to Studebakers, but Reo built only cargo-model trucks with the long wheelbase and without the front-mounted winch, more specifically referred to as the US6 U9. All production by both manufacturers ended in 1945.

Service
The US6 was manufactured primarily for export under Lend-Lease. The Soviet Union would become the largest foreign operator. The first Studebaker US6 trucks arrived in the USSR in the autumn of 1941. The Red Army organized a test of eleven 6×6 "Studebekkers" (as they become referred to in the USSR) which took place between July 1942 and May 1943. In 1945, it was lowered to  tons (3,200 kg), although on improved roads they could carry up to a maximum of 5 tons (4,500 kg).

Large numbers of Studebaker US6 trucks were supplied to the Soviet Union via the Persian Corridor in Iran under the USA's Lend-Lease program. The truck fulfilled many important roles in service with Soviet military forces during the war, such as towing artillery pieces and anti-tank guns and transporting troops over long distances. It was renowned for its overall ruggedness and reliability, including its ability to run on poor-quality fuel. The Soviet Red Army also found them to be a suitable platform for conversion into Katyusha rocket launchers, although this was not their main purpose. The truck became affectionately known as the Studer by Soviet troops and was even recognised of its importance (to the Soviet war effort) by Joseph Stalin, who sent a personal letter of appreciation to Studebaker, in which he thanked it for the superb quality of the US6 for Soviet service.

Studebaker US6 trucks were also used by the US military in the construction of the Ledo Road in Burma, and the Alcan Highway in North America, during WWII.

Specifications

Engine and driveline

A conservative-type and highly-reliable engine with a compression ratio of only 5.82:1, it could use 68-octane gasoline. This same engine was also used in the M3 Scout Car and, later, M8 Greyhound and M20 armoured cars (the latter was a variant (lacking the gun turret) of the M8 Greyhound).

The Warner T 93 5 speed transmission had a very low first, a direct fourth and an overdrive fifth gear. A power take-off could be fitted to operate a winch (mounted just below in front of the radiator) and/or the hydraulic hoist on dump trucks (the U10/U11 and U12/U13 dump truck models).

The Timken T-79 transfer case had high and low ranges, a neutral position and could either engage or disengage the front axle. There was one output shaft mounted forward to the front axle (not used in 6×4 trucks) and two to the rear, with one for each rear axle.

Both front and rear axles were of the Timken split-type with a ratio of 6.6:1. The front axle had ball-type constant-velocity joints while the two at the rear were full-floating.

Chassis
The US6 had a ladder frame with three beam axles, the front on semi elliptical leaf springs, the rear tandem on quarter elliptical leaf springs with locating arms.

There were two wheelbases, the short , used in semi tractors, dump trucks, and short cargo models, and the long , used in tankers, long cargo models, and the U9 chassis cab (measurements are from the centerline of the front axle to the centerline of rear bogie).

Cab
The US6 carried the design of Studebaker's civilian truck cab, although it was modified for military use. Studebaker trucks were different from other  6×6 trucks built for the war effort of the USA because vent windows were included in each door. These vent windows were separate from the main window that rolled down into the door-frame and could be swung out to help with the truck cab's ventilation.

Studebaker also designed the open-type military truck cab which was featured on the GMC CCKW (later models), but their major customer, the USSR, preferred the closed cab for their generally harsh (cold-weather) climate. While Studebaker's open-type truck cab became the American standard, production of the US6 with the closed-type truck cab was restarted after only 10,000 units of the former.

Models

These "prime mover"-style bodies were not a success as the US6 was to be mainly used for transporting cargo.

The U3/U4 and the 6×4 U7/U8 cargo trucks had a longer wheelbase, which allowed the spare tire to be mounted under the  truck-bed. 197,000 trucks with the  truck-bed were built.

The U5 tank truck had a long wheelbase and a two-compartment  tank mounted on the truck-bed. Tanker trucks were not equipped with winches.

The 6×4 U6 semi-tractor was the only semi-tractor version in the entire US6 truck series. Semi-tractors have limited off-road performance and, therefore, the U6 was rated for a 5-ton load on improved roads. For this same reason, they had no frontally-mounted winch.

The U9 cargo truck had a long wheelbase and lacked a frontally-mounted winch. The Soviet Katyusha multiple rocket launcher could be mounted on their truck-beds (most of the US6 trucks in Red Army service were of the U9 model).

The U10/U11 (end-type) and the U12/U13 (side-type) dump trucks had a short wheelbase. Both types had the dump-body mounted on a sub-frame at the rear of the truck, with the end-type dump having a hydraulic cylinder attached to the chassis with a lever arrangement while the side-type dump had the hydraulic cylinder mounted directly to the truck body.

Dimensions

Legacy

Some Studebaker US6 trucks that were shipped to the Soviet Union during WWII and decommissioned from service after 1945 had their cabs and plumage taken off and used in the prototypes of the GAZ-51 truck, which eventually underwent mass production in 1946. The construction of the Studebaker US6 strongly influenced the construction of the postwar ZIS-151 truck, which then evolved into the ZIL-157 truck which remained in production up until 1994.

The Studebaker US6 truck became a legendary vehicle with its Soviet operators at the time and was called the "King of Roads" by soldiers due to their reliability and dependability, and is still popular in Russian vehicle-collector circles and clubs. In the United States, these trucks are seen as the symbol for the Lend-Lease program to the USSR. It is estimated that an unrestored US6 truck would cost around $11,000, while a restored one would cost around $24,000. The most sought-after US6 trucks are the ones that were produced by REO Motors (U9 version), since only slightly over 20,000 units were built by them.

See also
List of the United States military vehicles by supply catalog designation
List of the United States military vehicles by model number
GMC CCKW -ton 6×6 truck

Notes

References

External links

Australian Studebakers US6 
 US -ton at Engines of the Red Army
Studebaker/Reo US6 at Olive-Drab.com
Studebaker/Reo US6 at The-Bluprints.com

US6
Military trucks of the United States
World War II vehicles of the United States
World War II vehicles of the Soviet Union
World War II vehicles
Military vehicles introduced from 1940 to 1944